Hsi Hsi/Sai Sai/Xi Xi (7 October 1937 – 18 December 2022) was the pseudonym of the Hong Kong author and poet Cheung Yin, "Ellen"/. She was born in Shanghai, and moved to Hong Kong at the age of twelve. She was formerly a teacher and had been a Hong Kong-based writer. Her works are also popular in Taiwan and mainland China. She had become a rather well-known figure to many secondary school students in Hong Kong. This was due in particular to one of her essays, "Shops" (店鋪), which was adopted as reading material for the Chinese Language paper in the Hong Kong Certificate of Education Examination (HKCEE) by the Hong Kong Examinations Authority of the time. In 2019, Hsi Hsi was the recipient of the Newman Prize for Chinese Literature.

Childhood

Hsi Hsi's ancestors came from Chungshan/Hsiangshan/Heungshan, Kwangtung (now Zhongshan, Guangdong). She was born in Putung, Shanghai, where she would go on to attend primary school. Hsi Hsi was born in 1937, though her Hong Kong identity card showed her year of birth as 1938. She thus believed that 1938 was her year of birth over the course of her life, until she consulted family documents following the death of her sister in the 2010's, and found out that she was actually born in 1937. In 1950, she immigrated to Hong Kong with her parents. Her father worked at Kowloon Motor Bus Company (KMB) as a ticket checker. Additionally, he had been a coach for a Division A football club, later becoming a referee since he was in Shanghai, thus Hsi Hsi developed an immense interest in football when she was young. Hsi Hsi was born as one of five children of her parents, two brothers and two sisters.

Hsi Hsi attended secondary school at Heep Yunn School, where lessons were taught in Cantonese; she started her English-instructed lessons from Form 4. As a junior secondary school student, she began to write for the local newspapers and magazines.

According to her in A Girl Like Me, the character  in her pen name is a pictogram symbolizing a girl playing hopskotch, which was her favourite game during childhood.

Early writing career
Hsi Hsi's first piece of published writing, a fourteen-line modern Chinese poem, was published in Everyone's Literature (人人文學) in the 1950s. When Hsi Hsi was studying in Form 3, she won the first prize in the senior section of a writing competition organised by Learn-Mates (學友). In 1957, she continued her studies at the Grantham College of Education (later merged with other constitute colleges to form the Hong Kong Institute of Education), and became a teacher at  after graduation. Besides poetry, novels, essays, fairy tales and translated literature, Hsi Hsi also wrote TV screenplays in the 1960s, like The Dark Green Age (黛綠年華) and The Window (窗), as well as numerous film reviews. She was a pioneer in the field of experimental film in Hong Kong.

As well as contributing to multiple newspaper and magazine columns, she was the editor of Chinese Students' Weekly poetry section (1960s), as well as Thumb Weekly (大拇指周報) (1975–1977) and Plain Leaf Literature (素葉文學) (1981–1984), which was the 68-volume magazine first published in 1980 by Su Yeh Publications, a publishing company founded by Xi Xi and her friends. Su Yeh Publications dedicated itself to publishing works by Hong Kong authors. Up until 1984, the publishing company had produced books in 22 categories, including A Loafer Who Burnt His Guitar (焚琴的浪子), a collection of Ma Lang's (馬朗) poems; A Tour in Mirrors (鏡遊), a Chinese movie critic's collection by Lin Nian-Tong (林年同); and My Resplendence (我的燦爛), an essay and poem collection by Zhong Ling-Ling (鍾玲玲). The publishing company continued its paper-based publishing until 2015.

Novels and short stories 
My City was published in 1979. Originally a serial on the newspaper Hong Kong Express, she presented the world as seen through young people's eyes. She also illustrated the serial with her own drawings, attached along with each publication in the newspaper. While the serial was not an attempt to critique social issues, it nevertheless tackled issues such as overcrowded spaces and overloading academic pressure. It has now become a staple in Hong Kong literature, ranked 51st by the Yazhou Zhoukan as one of the 100 best Chinese novels in the 20th century. It also became the inspiration for the 2015 documentary My City directed by Fruit Chan.

Deer Hunt, published in 1982, was inspired by the history during the Qing Dynasty when Qianlong was emperor. The novel described a plan of assassinating the emperor, and the remembrance of the emperor to his grandfather Kangxi. It was reprinted twice in Taiwan, once in 1986 and once in 1999.

Xi Xi enjoyed travelling; she has been to many countries in Eastern Europe, as well as Turkey, Egypt, Greece, and, most frequently, mainland China. Travelling to these places has done much to inspire her writing. In 1983, United Daily News published Xi Xi's A Woman Like Me (像我這樣的一個女子), a collection of short stories written between 1976 and 1982, and it was the first time her works were introduced to Taiwanese people. The collection won Xi Xi the Recommended Novella Prize, the highest honour in the United Daily News 8th Novel awards.

The 1992 novel Mourning a Breast (哀悼乳房) was written in order to document her feelings, thoughts, and encounters during her treatment with breast cancer, which she was diagnosed with in 1989. Due to the complications of her cancer surgery, she lost the function of her right hand by 1999 and had to write with her left hand. The novel was nominated by the China Times in 1992 as one of the ten best books of the year. It also provided the inspiration for the 2006 movie 2 Become 1 starring Miriam Yeung.

Later writing career
"Shops" is an essay written by Xi Xi, which was adopted as the reading material for the Chinese language paper of the HKCEE. This passage depicted the ageing buildings, squatters, and old-fashioned traditional shops in Central and Western District, particularly in Sheung Wan and Sai Ying Pun, as well as other activity in this hustling district. She expressed her nostalgia towards her childhood, and the reminiscence towards the disappearing old shops due to the drastic urban development.

Flying Carpet (飛氈), a novel inspired by the history of Hong Kong in the past one hundred years, was published in 1999. In the novel, Hong Kong was given the name of Fertillia (肥土鎮), a town at the edge of Dragonland (巨龍國), a projection of China, and the novel described how the town transformed in three generations.

In 2009, Xi Xi published the essay and photograph collection, The Teddy Bear Chronicles. She donated the teddy bears sewn and photographed in the book to the Chinese University of Hong Kong Library in 2018. In 2016, a collection of poems by Xi Xi was published in English under the title Not Written Words, which received the Lucien Stryk Asian Translation Prize in 2017. In 2019, Xi Xi was awarded the Newman Prize for Chinese Literature and the Cikada Prize.

List of works

Novels
 My City (1979)
 Deer Hunt (1982)
 Mourning a Breast (哀悼乳房) (1992)
 Flying Carpet (飛氈) (1999)

Short stories

Poetry collection
 Not Written Words

Newspaper and magazine columns
  A fairytale column in Tin Tin Daily (天天日報)
 "Movies and Me" (電影與我) in Chinese Students' Weekly (中國學生周報)
 "Bull's Eye and Me" (牛眼和我) in Express Daily (快報)
 "My Scrawling Room" (scrapbook) (《我之試寫室》剪貼冊) in Express Daily
 "Notes on Reading" (閱讀筆記) in Express Daily
 "The Flower Column" in Sing Tao Daily
 "Four Pieces of Jade" (四塊玉) in United Daily News 
 "Siu Ming Chow" (小明周) in Ming Pao
 "Ear-man" (隨耳想) in Sing Tao Daily
 "How Xi Xi Views Soccer" (西西看足球) in Ming Pao

Essays
 Shops
 The Teddy Bear Chronicles (縫熊志) (2009)

Further reading
 Chinese Writers on Writing featuring Xi Xi. Ed. Arthur Sze. (Trinity University Press, 2010).
 Not Written Words by Xi Xi (Author), Jennifer Feeley (Translator). (Zephyr Press, 2016).
. Eds. . (Chung Wa Books, 2018).
. (Chung Wa Books, 2018)

Portrait 
 Xi Xi. A Portrait by Kong Kai Ming at Portrait Gallery of Chinese Writers (Hong Kong Baptist University Library).

References

External links 
 Xi Xi City - a living exhibit devoted to Hong Kong, Xi Xi, and My City

1937 births
2022 deaths
Pseudonymous women writers
20th-century pseudonymous writers
Hong Kong novelists
Hong Kong poets
Hong Kong women writers
Chinese women educators
Chinese women essayists
Chinese women novelists
Chinese women poets
Poets from Shanghai
Writers from Shanghai